The 1941 Washington University Bears football team was an American football team that represented Washington University in St. Louis as a member of the Missouri Valley Conference (MVC) during the 1941 college football season. In their second and final season under head coach Frank Loebs, the Bears compiled a 4–5 record (1–3 against MVC opponents), finished fifth in the MVC, and were outscored by a total of 165 to 150. The team played its home games at Francis Field in St. Louis.

The team was led by senior halfback Bud Schwenk. During the 1941 season, Schwenk broke the national collegiate single-season records for completed passes (114) and yards of total offense (1,928). Schwenk also led the nation in 1941 with 1,457 passing yards.

Schedule

References

Washington University
Washington University Bears football seasons
Washington University Bears football